Footpath is a 2003 Indian Hindi-language crime thriller film directed by Vikram Bhatt, starring Aftab Shivdasani, Bipasha Basu and Rahul Dev along with Emraan Hashmi who made his debut film as the lead. The film was a remake of  Mahesh Bhatt's film Angaarey, which too was based on the same American film State of Grace. The film marked Hashmi's first Hindi language film.

Plot
Arjun Singh and the Srivastav brothers, Raghu  and Shekhar, are neighbors in a gangster-prone area in Mumbai. When Arjun's union leader father is killed, the brothers urge him to avenge his death. They get a sword and find the killers and kill them. Arjun is the prime suspect in this homicide and the brothers get him to run to Delhi, where he begins a new life as a Real Estate Agent, Mohan Kumar Sharma. Years later, Arjun returns to Mumbai and is welcomed with open arms by Raghu and Shekhar, who are now leading gangsters in their own right. Arjun also renews his romance with the estranged Srivastavs' sister, Sanjana. Sanjana would like Arjun and her brothers to go straight, and Arjun agrees with her and he starts to work on Raghu - the more flexible of the two - and partially succeeds - especially since Raghu is romantically involved with a school-teacher, who will have nothing to do with him unless he gives up all criminal activity. Raghu is seriously considering going straight when Shekhar gives him the devastating news, that Arjun is not who he claims to be - but a plainclothes police officer, who is out to get them by hook or by crook.

Cast
Aftab Shivdasani as Arjun Singh / Mohan Kumar Sharma
Emraan Hashmi as Raghunath "Raghu" Srivastav
Irrfan Khan as Sheikh Qadir
Bipasha Basu as Sanjana Srivastav
Rahul Dev as Shekhar Srivastav
Anup Soni as Police Inspector Singh
 Aparna Tilak as Shalini Vashisht (The English Teacher)
Anupama Verma as Pamela
Arif Zakaria as Shyam Ahuja
Jyothi Rana as item number in Soorat Pe Teri Pyaar Aave
Aryan Vaid as dancer Young in  Soorat Pe Teri Pyaar Aave

Soundtrack

The film's music was composed by Nadeem-Shravan and one song "Soorat Pe Teri Pyar Aave" composed by Himesh Reshammiya, while lyrics were penned by Sameer. The song "Chain Aapko Mila" also featured in Priyadarshan's Hungama, with Shaan and Sadhana Sargam as vocalists.

References

External links 
 

2003 films
2000s Hindi-language films
Films about organised crime in India
Films directed by Vikram Bhatt
Films scored by Nadeem–Shravan
Fratricide in fiction